Michael Harrington (born January 24, 1986) is a former American soccer player.

Career

College and amateur
Born in the North Carolina city of Greenville, Harrington attended the University of North Carolina at Chapel Hill where he played on the men's college soccer team from 2003 to 2006. During the collegiate off season, he also played for the Raleigh CASL Elite of the Premier Development League.

Professional
Harrington was selected in the first round (third overall) of the 2007 MLS SuperDraft by Kansas City Wizards. He finished 3rd overall in voting for Rookie of the Year.

After six years with Kansas City, Harrington was traded to Portland Timbers in December 2012 in exchange for allocation money. He was traded to the Colorado Rapids in exchange for allocation money following the 2014 season.

In January 2016, Harrington signed with the Chicago Fire.

In January 2018, Harrington signed with USL hometown side North Carolina FC.

International
Harrington was a member of the U-17 Residency Program at the Bradenton Academy and while there played for the US at the 2003 FIFA U-17 World Championship in Finland in which the team reached the quarterfinals. Two years later Harrington represented America at the 2005 FIFA World Youth Championship in the Netherlands.

Honors

Sporting Kansas City
Lamar Hunt U.S. Open Cup: 2012

References

External links

1986 births
Living people
American soccer players
Association football defenders
Chicago Fire FC players
Colorado Rapids players
Major League Soccer players
North Carolina FC players
North Carolina Tar Heels men's soccer players
Parade High School All-Americans (boys' soccer)
Sportspeople from Greenville, North Carolina
Portland Timbers players
North Carolina FC U23 players
Soccer players from North Carolina
Sporting Kansas City draft picks
Sporting Kansas City players
United States men's youth international soccer players
USL League Two players